The LA Current is a professional swimming club and one of the original eight clubs of the International Swimming League. The team is based in Los Angeles, CA led by general manager Lenny Krayzelburg and head coach David Marsh.
 
During the inaugural season in 2019 they earned their spot in the final as one of the top two teams in their division. They secured their spot in the Final by winning the US Derby. The Current finished 4th place in 2019 ISL Finals.

Head coaches
David Marsh (2019-2021)

2019 International Swimming League season

Team roster 
ISL teams had a maximum roster of 32 athletes for 2019 season, with a suggested size of each club's traveling roster of 28 (14 men and 14 women). Each club had a captain and a vice-captain of different gender. Majority of the Current roster consisted of Americans athletes but did include a few from other countries around the world.

Match results

2020 International Swimming League season

Team roster 
ISL teams had a maximum roster of 32 athletes for 2020 season, with a suggested size of each club's traveling roster of 28 (14 men and 14 women). Each club had a captain and a vice-captain of different gender. Due to the COVID-19 pandemic, the entire ISL 2020 season was held at the Danube Arena in Budapest, Hungary. From October 16 - November 22, all swimmers and coaching staff operated in a bio-secure bubble.

Match results

References 

Swimming clubs
International Swimming League
Sports teams in Los Angeles
Swim teams in the United States